The Embassy of India in Washington, D.C. is the diplomatic mission of the Republic of India to the United States. It is headed by the Indian Ambassador to the United States. The current Ambassador is Taranjit Singh Sandhu.

India also has consulates-general in Atlanta, Chicago, Houston, New York City and San Francisco which are all associated with the Indian Embassy.

Building
The chancery is hosted in two interconnected structures. The older one was built in 1885, and had four floors added to it in 1907. Physician T. Morris Murray had the other one finished in 1901, using granite and limestone in a French style. It was owned by numerous elites over the years, with the building becoming known as Depew House after one of its last former owners, May Palmer Depew, the widow of Chauncey Depew. After she died in 1940, it was leased out to other tenants until the Indian government bought it in 1946 and connected the two buildings.

Embassy of India Student Hub
The Embassy launched the India Student Hub in 2019 to encourage Indian students' well-being and development.

For the 2019–2020 academic year, the Embassy of India Student Hub ran a robust Campus Lead Program with over 60 campus ambassadors at 40+ U.S. institutes of higher education. The Campus Lead Program is designed to help the Embassy and Consulates stay in touch with Indian students and each other, and to help share opportunities for interested students and faculty to engage with India. The Campus Leads can create their own projects and initiatives that build leadership skills among their peer students, through events like hackathons, festivals, and challenges. In February 2020, the Embassy Student Hub hosted the first Women's Film Festival, paying homage to women's voice, strength and resilience.

The Embassy of India has taken several steps to render support for its non-immigrant Indian student population in the United States on F and M visas, many facilitated through the Student Hub.

During the COVID-19 pandemic of 2020, the Student Hub was instrumental in safeguarding the welfare of 200,000 Indian international students, advising them and rendering assistance releasing over 10 student advisories and updates in the first three months of the pandemic. A Non-Emergency Peer Support Line was set up in March 2020 help students connect with and seek advice from their peers, in addition to existing Embassy of India 24x7 phone lines. In April 2020, the Ambassador of India to the United States used the Embassy's Student Hub to communicate directly with students through a viral Instagram live session at the start of the pandemic. The Embassy of India Student Hub hosted a virtual graduation celebration in May 2020 to encourage students who had their Commencement ceremonies cancelled or deferred due to the public health emergency.

In July 2020, the Embassy connected with United States officials at the heels of a Student and Exchange Visitor Program rule change for the Fall 2020 semester that would require F-1 students to depart the country if their programs were fully online.

Several notable figures like Sunita Williams,  Aparna Kumar and Ela Gandhi have interacted with Indian students through the Embassy Student Hub.

See also
 India–United States relations
 Foreign relations of India
 Foreign relations of the United States
 List of diplomatic missions of India
 List of diplomatic missions in the United States

References

External links

 
 Embassy of India Student Hub
wikimapia

Houses completed in 1885
Houses completed in 1907
India
Washington, D.C.
India
Historic district contributing properties in Washington, D.C.
India–United States relations
India